(born July 12, 1939 in Kyoto, Japan) is a Japanese actress. Her father is kabuki actor Nakamura Ganjirō II. 

She was scouted by director Teruo Ogiyama and made her film debut with Kageko to Yukie when she was a junior high school student. After graduating junior high school, she signed her contract with Daiei film company in 1954. She married actor Shintaro Katsu in 1962.

Filmography

Film

 Zenigata Heiji: Ghost Lord (1954)
 Three Stripes in the Sun (1955)
 Flowery Brothers (1956)
 Sisters of the Gion (1956)
 Zangiku monogatari (1956)
 An Osaka Story (1957)
 Onibi Kago (1957)
 The Loyal 47 Ronin (1958)
 Nuregami kenpō (1958)
 Enjō (1958)
 The Demon of Mount Oe (1960)
 Scar Yosaburo (1960)
 Satan's Sword (1960)
 Satan's Sword II (1960)
 The Human Condition (1961)
 Ten Dark Women (1961)
 Satan's Sword III (1961)
 Enter Kyōshirō Nemuri the Swordman (1963) as Chisa
 Taking The Castle (1965)
 The Man Without a Map (1968)
 The River with No Bridge (1992)
 The Inugami (2006)
 Ninja Kids!!! (2011), Shina Yamamoto
 Destiny: The Tale of Kamakura (2017), Kin
 The One I Long to See (2023)

Television
 Shin Heike Monogatari (1972), Taira no Tokiko
 Hissatsu Shikakenin (1972)
 Hissatsu Shiokiya Kagyō (1975)
 Abarenbō Shōgun repeating role as mother of title character
 Beppin san (2016), Tokuko Bandō

References

Sources

External links
 Official profile
 

People from Kyoto
1939 births
Living people
Japanese actresses